The 2007 FIBA Under-19 World Championship (Serbian: Светско првенство до 19 година ФИБА до 19 година) was the 8th edition of the FIBA U19 World Championship. It was held in Novi Sad, Serbia from 12 to 22 July 2007. The host nation won the tournament after beating the United States 74–69 in the final. Milan Mačvan was named the tournament MVP.

Venue

Qualified teams

Preliminary round

Group A

Group B

Group C

Group D

Second round

Group E

Group F

Classification 13th–16th
</onlyinclude>

Semifinals

15th place

13th place

Classification 9th–12th
</onlyinclude>

Semifinals

11th place

9th place

Knockout stage

Bracket

Quarterfinals

5th–8th place semifinals

Semifinals

7th place

5th place

3rd place

Final

Final standings

Medal rosters
  4 Mladen Jeremić, 5 Petar Despotović, 6 Dušan Katnić, 7 Stefan Marković, 8 Marko Kešelj, 9 Aleksandar Radulović, 10 Stefan Stojačić, 11 Marko Čakarević, 12 Milan Mačvan, 13 Miroslav Raduljica, 14 Boban Marjanović, 15 Slaven Čupković (Head coach: Miroslav Nikolić)

  4 Tajuan Porter, 5 Stephen Curry, 6 Jonny Flynn, 7 Patrick Beverley, 8 Matt Bouldin, 9 David Lighty, 10 Donté Greene, 11 Raymar Morgan, 12 Deon Thompson, 13 Damian Hollis, 14 Michael Beasley, 15 DeAndre Jordan (Head coach: Jerry Wainwright)

  4 Jessie Bégarin, 5 Nicolas Batum, 6 Antoine Diot, 7 Abdoulaye M'Baye, 8 Olivier Romain, 9 Alexis Ajinça, 10 Benoît Mangin, 11 Edwin Jackson, 12 Rudy Etilopy, 13 Kim Tillie, 14 Ludovic Vaty, 15 Adrien Moerman (Head coach: Richard Billant)

Referees
  Carlos José Julio
  Marcos Fornies Benito
  Yanping Song
  Eddie Viator
  Konstantinos Koromilas
  Enrico Sabetta
  Yuji Hirahara
  Tomas Jasevičius
  Ilija Belošević
  Recep Ankaralı
  Jeff Nichols

Awards

References

External links
 Official website
 FIBA Basketball Archive

2007
2007 in basketball
International youth basketball competitions hosted by Serbia
Sports competitions in Novi Sad
2007–08 in Serbian basketball
July 2007 sports events in Europe
21st century in Novi Sad